Jean-Dominique Burton, born on 13 October 1952 in Huy (Belgium), is a Belgian photographer and filmmaker, author of several books of photographs focusing on Europe, Asia and Africa. Since 1978, numerous exhibitions have been dedicated to his work, in Europe (in galleries and in the Paris metro), Africa (notably on the occasion of the Francophonie Summit, OIF, in November 2014), North America (San Francisco and Stanford University) and Asia. Many of his works have also been included in public and private collections.

Biography 
For more than twenty years, he travelled from the Atlas Mountains to the Himalayas where he produced numerous photographic works. Since the early 2000s, he has been working on African civilisations, building a trilogy on Porto-Novo, Abomey and Ouidah, three cities in Benin that played an active part in the history of the Slave Trade and of which the island of Gorée (Senegal) has become the symbol.

Since 2010, he has also been making short documentaries and/or contemplative films, as animated and audio complements to his photographic approach.

Since its creation in 2005, he has been linked to the Fondation Zinsou (Cotonou-Benin) with which he has held three exhibitions and three publications. He is also present in the permanent collection of the Museum of Contemporary Art in Ouidah (Villa Ajavon), inaugurated by the Foundation in 2013.

In Africa, Jean-Dominique Burton has produced photographic works dedicated to the traditional chiefs of Burkina Faso, Beninese Voodoo, the Nago hunters of Bantè, Benin, the Matonge neighbourhoods of Kinshasa and Brussels, the city of Porto-Novo and the island of Gorée.

When he is not travelling, Jean-Dominique Burton lives in Belgium, in Rixensart, a small municipality in Walloon Brabant.

Bibliography 

 Sans Papiers Photographiques – Prisme éditions, 2019
Île de Gorée Island, – Prisme éditions, 2014
 Chasseurs Nagô du Royaume de Bantè, Fondation George Arthur Forrest / Fondation Zinsou. 2012
 Porto-Novo, cité rouge esprit de lagune, Fondation Zinsou, 2011
 Matonge / Matonge, éditions Lannoo, 2010
 Porto-Novo, édition digitale limitée, PMR, 2009
 Souvenirs d’Afrique – Herinneringen uit Africa, 5 Continents – Musée de l’Afrique centrale, 2008
 Vaudou /Voodoo/ Vudu, 5 Continents – Fondation Zinsou, 2007
 Naabas: Traditional Chiefs of Burkina Faso, Snoeck, Gand, 2006
 L’Allée des Rois, Ed. Altitude – Snoeck, 2004
 The Rebirth of the Budapest Gresham Palace – CBR – Altitude – 2004
 Hong-Kong Vision, Bruxelles, Hong-Kong Economic and Trade – Office, 2001
 Masques et Traces, Bruxelles, Soleil noir, 1999
 Wallonie/Kent, Charleroi, musée de la Photographie, 1999–2000
 Hong-Kong Transit, en collaboration avec France Borel, Bruxelles, ZB 22, 1997
 Viêt-View, Bruxelles, Glénat – Benelux, 1996
 Semois: les derniers planteurs, Bruxelles, éditions de l’Octogone, 1995
 Écorces, Bruxelles, éditions de l’Octogone, 1994
 Épreuves d’artistes, Namur, Remo Zandona, 1990
 Double Portrait, un Sculpteur / un Photographe – Formes et Lumières – Portfolio 5 exemplaires – 1989
 Collectionneurs – Portfolio 5 exemplaires – 1988
 Portraits d’Hier Aujourd’hui – Portfolio 5 exemplaires – 1985

External links 

 Official Website

References 

1952 births
Living people
Belgian photographers